Yury Vladimirovich Petrovsky (born 14 October 2000) is a Russian football player. He plays for FC Baltika-BFU Kaliningrad.

Club career
He made his debut in the Russian Football National League for FC Baltika Kaliningrad on 17 July 2021 in a game against FC Tom Tomsk.

References

External links
 
 Profile by Russian Football National League

2000 births
Footballers from Saint Petersburg
Living people
Russian footballers
Association football midfielders
FC Arsenal Tula players
FC Baltika Kaliningrad players
FC Salyut Belgorod players
Russian Second League players
Russian First League players